The Most Esteemed Family Order of Seri Utama is an order of Brunei. It was established on 1 March 1954 by Sultan Omar Ali Saifuddien III. The order carries the post-nominal letters "DK" as well as the title "Dato Seri Utama".

Recipients

Ordinary recipients (D.K.) 
 1967: Jaya Rajid, Commissioner of Police
 1968: Sufri Bolkiah, Prince of Brunei
 Unknown: Abdul Momin Ismail, Menteri Besar
 Unknown: Ibrahim Mohammad Jahfar, Menteri Besar
 Unknown: Jamil Al-Sufri, former Member of the Royal Council

Honorary recipients (D.K.) 
 1958: Sultan Abu Bakar of Pahang
 1963: Dennis White, British High Commissioner to Brunei
 1963: Angus Mackintosh, British High Commissioner to Brunei

See also 
 Family Order of Laila Utama

References 

Orders, decorations, and medals of Brunei
Awards established in 1954
1954 establishments in Brunei